Congis-sur-Thérouanne is a commune in the Seine-et-Marne department in the Île-de-France region in north-central France.

Demographics
The inhabitants are called Congissois.

Schools
The communal preschool and elementary school is the École "Casse-Noisettes". Junior high school students attend Collège Camille-Saint-Saëns in Lizy-sur-Ourcq and Collège du Champivert in Crouy-sur-Ourcq. There is one senior high school/sixth-form college in the commune, Lycée du Gué-à-Tresmes.

People linked to the commune 
 Pierre Baillet, (born Paris c.1447; died Auxerre before 1513), lord of Villers-lès-Rigault, a former commune merged with Congis-sur-Thérouanne in 1807. He is interred in the Saint-Alexandre chapel, behind the choir, with his brother, Jean III Baillet, Bishop of Auxerre.
 Henri Hérouin, (1876-?), Olympic champion archer at the 1900 Summer Olympics in Paris.

See also
Communes of the Seine-et-Marne department

References

External links

Home page 
1999 Land Use, from IAURIF (Institute for Urban Planning and Development of the Paris-Île-de-France région) 
 

Communes of Seine-et-Marne